Actinia pedunculata is an unaccepted scientific name and may refer to:
 Aulactinia verrucosa, the gem anemone
 Cereus pedunculatus, the daisy anemone